Totontepec Villa de Morelos is a small village and municipality, in the Sierra Mixe district of the Mexican state of Oaxaca.  It is located some 1840 metres above sea level and some 326 km from the state capital, Oaxaca de Juárez. In spite of the Mixe influence, the toponym is Nahuatl in origin, meaning "hot hill".

The town 

The locals, called Totontepecanos, speak Mexican Spanish and the local dialect of the Mixe language.  Each dialect of Mixe is different depending on the village in which it is spoken. According to the 2005 census, the town had a population of 5,626 people.

The town's most notable feature is a rock that can be seen from nearly every location. They call it "La Mitra" (or mitre, in English).  It is located at the top of the mountain on which Totontepec is built.  The locals will scale this mountain to light prayer candles and get a great view of their town.

Totontepec is home to an unusual landrace of maize, locally known as "olotón", but more commonly described in the English-speaking world as "Sierra Mixe". This corn grows aerial roots secreting sugary mucus to feed nitrogen-fixing bacteria, fertilizing itself to thrive in the poor local soil in exchange.

The municipality
According to the 2005 Census, the municipality had a total population of 4,780, many of whom were proficient of an indigenous tongue. The municipality covers 318.95 km2.

As municipal seat, Totontepec has governing jurisdiction over the following communities:

Chinantequilla, El Duraznal, Patio Grande, Rancho Alejandro Villegas, San Francisco Jayacaxtepec, San Marcos Moctum, San Miguel Metepec, Santa María Huitepec, Santa María Ocotepec, Santa María Tiltepec, Santiago Amatepec, Santiago Jareta, Santiago Tepitongo, and Tierra Caliente (Rancho Uno y Rancho Dos)

References

External links
Totontepec Villa de Morelos (Enciclopedia de los Municipios)
Totontepec Villa de Morelos (oaxaca.gob.mx)

Municipalities of Oaxaca